Jhansi Ki Rani ( The Queen of Jhansi) is an Indian historical drama television series based on the life of warrior queen Lakshmi Bai, the Rani of Jhansi. The show, starring Anushka Sen went to air on Colors TV on 11 February 2019.  Due to low TRPs, the show ended on 12 July 2019 completing 110 episodes. It was replaced by Bahu Begum.

Plot
The show depicts the life of Manikarnika, a female warrior who becomes Rani Lakshmi Bai. The story begins with Manikarnika stealing the British flag and unfurling the flag of their nation. This angers the British and they search for the person who burnt their flag. As part of her journey, Manu marries King Gangadhar Rao of Jhansi, taking a position giving her the power to fight for independence for Jhansi as well as the rest of India. She becomes the Queen of Jhansi, one of the most abundant kingdoms, but not yet free from British rule. She fights both traitors to Jhansi and British rule despite the restrictions of traditional roles for women.

Cast

Main
 Anushka Sen  as Manikarnika Rao or Manu Tambe/Rani Lakshmi Bai / Jhansi Ki Rani
 Vikkas Manaktala as Raja Gangadhar Rao; Rani Lakshmi Bai's husband; King of Jhansi

Recurring
 Anuja Sathe as Rani Janki Bai, Gangadhar's sister-in-law
 Jason Shah as Captain Ross
 Aishwarya Raj Bhakuni as Ramabai, Gangadhar's first wife
 Rajesh Shringarpure as Morapant Tambe, Manu's father
 Anshul Trivedi as Tantia Tope
 Ryan Larson as Captain Robb, Ross' brother
 Mak Mukesh Tripathi as Shiva Krantikari
 Ankur Nayyar as Gangadas
 Dolly Sohi as Sakubai, Gangadhar's eldest sister-in-law
 Himanshu Bamzai as Raghunath Rao
 Vijay Kashyap as Baji Rao II
 Piyali Munshi as Lachcho Bai, Gangadhar's younger sister-in-law
Gaurav Vasudev as Captain Smith
 Naveen Pandita as Ali Bahadur
 Aamir Rafiq as British Army Officer
 Andy Von Eich as British Officer Masion
 Namit Shah as Nana Sahib
 Jagriti Sethia As Kaashi
 Athar Siddiqui as Veerbhadra
 Naren Kumar as Madanpal
Nadeem Ahmad Khan as Britisher
 Chandan K Anand as Ghaus Khan
 Chandrahas Pandey as Pandurang
 Trupti Mishra as Manjari

Production

Development
In 2019, the production house Contiole Entertainment rebooted their 2009 Zee TV series Jhansi Ki Rani for Colors TV.

In January 2019, a massive fire broke out on the sets at Aamgaon where initial sequences were shot.

References

External links
 
 

Hindi-language television shows
Historical television series
Indian historical television series
Indian period television series
2019 Indian television series debuts
2019 Indian television series endings
Colors TV original programming
Cultural depictions of Rani Laxmibai
Television series set in the 19th century